Fort Albany may refer to:
 Fort Albany, Ontario, Canada
 Fort Albany (Arlington, Virginia), a bastioned earthwork built during the American Civil War
 Fort Frederick (Albany), an English fort at the current site of Albany, New York, later known as Fort Albany